In enzymology, an ecdysone oxidase is an enzyme that catalyzes the chemical reaction

ecdysone + O2  3-dehydroecdysone + H2O2

Thus, the two substrates of this enzyme are ecdysone and O2, whereas its two products are 3-dehydroecdysone and H2O2.

This enzyme may or may not belong to the family of oxidoreductases, specifically those acting on the CH-OH group of donor with oxygen as acceptor.  The systematic name of this enzyme class is ecdysone:oxygen 3-oxidoreductase. This enzyme might also be called beta-ecdysone oxidase.

References

 

EC 1.1.3
Enzymes of unknown structure